Look-a-Like is a Canadian reality television series that debuted on May 4, 2004 on CTV. It is produced by Kaleidoscope Entertainment.

References

English-language television shows